Channel Z may refer to:

Radio stations 
Channel Z (Radio Station), in New Zealand
 WGAC-FM  (1992–1996), in Augusta, Georgia, former rock station WCHZ, Channel Z-95.1
 Channel Z 97.3 FM (1998–2003), in Cincinnati, Ohio
 Channel Z 98.9/105.7 FM (1997–2000), in Columbus, Ohio

Other uses 
"Channel Z" (song), a 1989 song by The B-52's
Channel Z, the prototype Amiga 1200 computer by Commodore

See also 
 Z Channel (disambiguation)
 Z (disambiguation)